Arne Marnix Naudts (born 27 November 1993) is a Belgian professional footballer player who plays as forward for Patro Eisden.

Career
On 23 March 2011, Naudts made his debut at the highest level of Belgian football. Naudts replaced Wang Yang in the 83rd minute, in a 0–3 victory for Cercle Brugge against Sporting Charleroi.

Naudts' contract expired at Helmond Sport in the summer of 2019, allowing him to sign as a free player for Unterhaching in July 2019. Only three weeks later however, Naudts left the club already to play for Lommel, as he could not cope with the large travelling distance from his home in Belgium. After one season, he signed with Dutch club MVV Maastricht on 6 October 2020.

On 29 June 2021, he signed with Patro Eisden.

References

External links
 Arne Naudts player info at the official Cercle Brugge site 
 Cerclemuseum.be 
 

1993 births
Footballers from Ghent
Living people
Belgian footballers
Belgium youth international footballers
Association football forwards
Cercle Brugge K.S.V. players
K.M.S.K. Deinze players
K.R.C. Mechelen players
Helmond Sport players
SpVgg Unterhaching players
Lommel S.K. players
MVV Maastricht players
K. Patro Eisden Maasmechelen players
Belgian Pro League players
Challenger Pro League players
Eerste Divisie players
Belgian expatriate footballers
Expatriate footballers in Germany
Expatriate footballers in the Netherlands
Belgian expatriate sportspeople in Germany
Belgian expatriate sportspeople in the Netherlands